Pygmy devil ray is a common name for several fishes and may refer to:

Mobula eregoodootenkee, native to the Indian and western Pacific Oceans
Mobula munkiana, native to the eastern Pacific Ocean